Kusmah District is a district of the Raymah Governorate, Yemen. As of 2003, the district had a population of 74,622 inhabitants.

References

Districts of Raymah Governorate